Artis Rasmanis (born 1971) is a retired Latvian sidecarcross passenger and five times World Champion.

Rasmanis was part of the most successful partnership in sidecarcross world championship history, winning five titles with his driver Kristers Serģis. He retired from international sidecar competition after their fifth title in 2002. He is however still active in the motor sport, racing quad bikes now, finishing 12th in the FIM European championship in 2007.

He now works as a manager at SIA "Rasmanis & Dankers". He originally graduated as an agricultural machinery mechanic from Priekuļi agricultural technical school in Cēsis District in 1990.

In 2014, Rasmanis was elected as a deputy of the Saeima from the Union of Greens and Farmers.

Sidecarcross world championship results
Artis Rasmanis entered the sidecarcross world championship in 1992, with Kristers Serģis as his driver. After two seasons with limited success and starts, Serģis switched to Normunds Bērziņš as his partner for 1994 and 1995 but continued to have only a small impact on the race circuit. In late 1995 Artis Rasmanis returned as his partner and in 1996, in the fourth race of the season they achieved their first race win, on 21 April in Betekom, Belgium. The season after, their fortunes improved greatly and the duo won their first of five world championships this year. In 1998, they repeated their success and in 1999 they missed out by only one point to Daniël Willemsen / Marcel Willemsen on their third triumph. Also, in 1998, they won the German sidecarcross championship. However, Serģis / Rasmanis continued their successful partnership with three more titles in 2000, 2001 and 2002. With their fifth title they became record holders in world cup wins in this sport. Previously, two drivers had archived four crowns, but none five. After this fifth title, Rasmanis retired from international competition but Serģis continued to race.

Season by season

Source:
 Passengers in italics.

Honours

World Championship
 Champions: (5) 1997, 1998, 2000, 2001, 2002
 Runners-up: (1) 1999

Germany
 Champions: (1) 1998

References

External links
 Rasmanis & Dankers website 
 The World Championship on Sidecarcross.com

1971 births
Living people
Latvian sidecarcross riders
People from Cēsis
Deputies of the Saeima